Clivina acuducta is a species of ground beetle in the subfamily Scaritinae. It was described by Haldeman in 1843.

References

acuducta
Beetles described in 1843
Taxa named by Samuel Stehman Haldeman